Kashima District is either:
 Kashima District, Ibaraki, Japan
 Kashima District, Ishikawa, Japan